The Indian Financial System Code (IFS Code or IFSC) is an alphanumeric code that facilitates electronic funds transfer in India. A code uniquely identifies each bank branch participating in the three main Payment and settlement systems in India: the National Electronic Funds Transfer (NEFT), Real Time Gross Settlement (RTGS) and Immediate Payment Service (IMPS) systems.

Format
The IFSC is an 11-character code with the first four alphabetic characters representing the bank name, and the last six characters (usually numeric, but can be alphabetic) representing the branch. The fifth character is 0 (zero) and reserved for future use. Bank IFS Code is used by the NEFT & RTGS systems to route the messages to the destination banks/branches.
The format of the IFS Code is shown below.

Lists of IFS Codes
Bank-wise lists of IFS Codes are available with all the bank-branches participating in inter bank electronic funds transfer. A list of bank-branches participating in NEFT/RTGS and their IFS Code is available on the website of the Reserve Bank of India. All the banks have also been advised to print the IFS code of the branch on cheques issued by branches to their customers.

See also 
 List of financial regulatory authorities by country

References

 https://www.npci.org.in/national-automated-clearing-live-members-1
 https://rbidocs.rbi.org.in/rdocs/RTGS/DOCs/RTGEB0815.xlsx
 https://rbidocs.rbi.org.in/rdocs/content/docs/68774.xlsx

External links 
Find IFSC of Banks' Branches on Reserve Bank of India's Website
List of NEFT Enabled Bank Branches (with IFSC) on Reserve Bank of India's Website

Banking in India
Real-time gross settlement
E-commerce in India
Financial routing standards
Standards of India